Sulflower (a portmanteau of sulfur and sunflower) is a stable heterocyclic octacirculene based on thiophene. Sulflower does not contain any hydrogen. With molecular formula (C2S)8 the compound is considered a type of carbon sulfide. The molecule is flat and together with the 9-membered homolog is at a local strain energy minimum.

Its synthesis (a variation of the Ferrario reaction) is based on deprotonation of a tetrathiophene with lithium diisopropylamide followed by reaction with elemental sulfur to a sulfur-substituted intermediate followed by vacuum pyrolysis.

The sulflower molecule has a planar structure with D8h symmetry, i.e., all eight sulfur atoms as well as the two faces of the molecule are undistinguishable. Because of its planar structure, it is predicted to be able to store many hydrogen molecules between the stacks. The conformation of the H2 molecule is calculated to be "standing up" over the five membered rings. Detailed DFT calculations have been performed on these molecules.

References 

Polycyclic aromatic compounds
Thiophenes